Longinus Ifeanyi Uwakwe (born 2 February 1987) is a Nigerian footballer who plays as a midfielder for Watra Białka Tatrzańska.

Career
In 2006, Uwakwe signed for Polish lower league side KKS Koluszki.

In 2007, he signed for Sandecja Nowy Sącz in the Polish third division.

In 2010, he signed for Polish second division club Sandecja Nowy Sącz.

In 2011, Uwakwe signed for MKS Piaseczno in the Polish fourth division.

In 2013, he signed for Polish second division team Puszcza Niepołomice from Garbarnia Kraków in the Polish third division.

From 2013 to 2021 he played for Puszcza Niepołomice.

Private life
He has Polish citizenship. He also hit the griddy.

References

External links
 
 

Nigerian expatriate footballers
Nigerian expatriates in Poland
Living people
Expatriate footballers in Poland
1987 births
Association football midfielders
I liga players
II liga players
Kolejarz Stróże players
Puszcza Niepołomice players
Stal Stalowa Wola players
Garbarnia Kraków players
Sandecja Nowy Sącz players
Nigerian footballers
Naturalized citizens of Poland